Milam is an unincorporated community in Wyoming County, West Virginia, United States.

The community takes its name from nearby Milam Fork.

References

Unincorporated communities in West Virginia
Unincorporated communities in Wyoming County, West Virginia